Air Chief Marshal Dilbagh Singh, PVSM, AVSM, VM (10 March 1926 – 9 February 2001) was the head of the Indian Air Force from 1981 to 1984, as Chief of the Air Staff. He was the second Sikh to hold that position.

Dilbagh Singh was commissioned as a pilot in 1944. His operational flying career spanned the Spitfire to introducing the MiG-21 into service in India. He had earlier made the first official "Supersonic Bang" over India in New Delhi when the Mystere IV-A was showcased in a public demonstration.

He was India's Ambassador to Brazil from 1985 to 1987. He was a student of pandit Buta Ram of Rahon. His visit to Rahon to visit his teacher when he was Air Marshal is still remembered. He inspired scores of youngsters from Rahon and Nawanshahar region to join defense forces

References

External links
 Ex-Air Chief Dilbagh Singh dead, The Tribune, 11 Feb 2001
 Air Chiefs, www.bharat-rakshak.com
 Sikh Pilots in the Indian Air Force in World War Two, www.bharat-rakshak.com

Indian aviators
Chiefs of Air Staff (India)
Indian Air Force air marshals
1926 births
2001 deaths
Indian Sikhs
Military personnel from Punjab, India
Ambassadors of India to Brazil
Recipients of the Param Vishisht Seva Medal
Recipients of the Ati Vishisht Seva Medal
Indian Air Force officers
National Defence College, India alumni
Recipients of the Vayu Sena Medal